Oihane Otaegi (born 20 May 1977 in San Sebastián, Basque Country, Spain) is a Spanish curler.

Teams

Women's

Mixed

Mixed doubles

Personal life
Her twin sister Leire Otaegi is also a curler. They are teammates.

References

External links

 

Living people
1977 births
Sportspeople from San Sebastián
Spanish female curlers
Spanish curling champions
Spanish twins
Twin sportspeople
21st-century Spanish women